Libona, officially the Municipality of Libona (Bukid and Higaonon: Banuwa ta Libona;), is a 1st class municipality in the province of Bukidnon, Philippines. According to the 2020 census, it has a population of 48,965 people.

Libona is situated in the northern part of the province and is approximately 103 kilometers from Malaybalay, the capital city of Bukidnon. The municipality can be reached from Cagayan de Oro, the major trade center of Northern Mindanao, through a 52 kilometer-route passing Barangay Alae of Manolo Fortich, or through a 32 kilometer road northward passing Barangay Indahag, Cagayan de Oro.

History

According to folk history, gold had flourished in the locality that prompted people from the neighboring towns flocked into this place in their quest for the golden fame and fortune. It was said that on January 17, 1817, A Spanish soldier who was on patrol was tasked to write down the names of the places he would come across within the course of his mission. He happened to pass by a group of men who were digging gold on one of the gold mines. Talking in Spanish, the soldier inquired about the name of the place. The natives, who did not understand the language, thought the soldier was asking them how many gold ores they have already gathered. In response, the natives answered "libo na", meaning a thousand already. The Spanish soldier jotted the word "Libona" in his logbook believing it was the name of the locality.

Libona was once a municipal district of Maluko, now the Municipality of Manolo Fortich, Bukidnon, created under EO No. 5 dated April 4, 1917 issued by then acting Governor Ponciano C. Reyes of the defunct Department of Mindanao and Sulu. Due to its progressive stride in both the socio-economic and political infrastructure, Libona was finally able to separate itself from her mother municipality when it was granted political identity. then President Carlos P. Garcia, issued EO No. 272, dated October 4, 1957 declaring Libona a regular municipality. By virtue of the said order, Libona became the 14th municipality in the province of Bukidnon.

Geography

Climate

Barangays
Libona is politically subdivided into 14 barangays.

Demographics

Economy

Local government

Municipal officials (2022-2025):
 Mayor: Aurelio B. Lopez
 Vice Mayor: Leonardo Genesis T. Calingasan
 Sangguniang Bayan Members:
 Hanalee T. Calingasan
 Noel B. Woo
 Czar Ian R. Abas
 Feliciano C. Gabito Jr.
 Vladimir P. Gallego
 Rex W. Tacandong
 Fernando P. Ibarita
 Rella A. Fernandez

Education

Learning Centers
The MSWDO have established several Children learning centers in the municipality where in fact every barangays have one or two centers.

Preparatory
The most notable one is the
San Miguel Escuela de Jesus Nazareno in the barangay of Crossing.

DepEd Libona are divided into two districts; the Libona 1 and Libona 2

Elementary Schools
Currently Libona accounted over 20 Elementary School that caters the youth in the different barangays in the municipality.

Junior/Senior High Schools

1.Libona National High School (Crossing)
2.Kinawe National High School (Kinawe)
3.Hossana Academy of Bukidnon Inc. (Gango)
4.Sil-ipon Integrated School
(Sil-ipon)

Tertiary

1.Bukidnon State University -  Libona Satellite Campus (Poblacion)

And also every barangay hosted Alternative Learning Systems for the out of-school-youth in the municipality.

References

External links
 [ Philippine Standard Geographic Code]
Philippine Census Information

Municipalities of Bukidnon
Establishments by Philippine executive order